David Drummond may refer to:

 David Drummond (businessman), American executive
 David Drummond (minister) (1805–1877), Scottish minister and photographer
 David Drummond (physician) (1852–1932), Irish/British physician and academic
 David Drummond (politician) (1890–1965), member of the New South Wales Legislative Assembly in 1920
 David Drummond, 8th Earl of Perth (1907–2002), Scottish peer, banker, and politician
 David Drummond, 2nd Lord Drummond (c. 1515–1571), see Earl of Perth#Lords Drummond of Cargill (1488)